Mixed marriage may refer to:

 Intermarriage
 Endogamy
 Exogamy
 Interracial marriage
 Interethnic marriage
 Interreligious marriage, also called interfaith marriage
 Lavender marriage
 Marital conversion, religious conversion based on marriage
 Miscegenation
 Mixed-orientation marriage, marriage involving spouses who do not have the same sexual orientation
 Mixed Marriage (play), a 1911 play by St John Greer Ervine
 Royal intermarriage
 Transnational marriage